The Sheffield Blitz is the name given to the worst nights of German Luftwaffe bombing in Sheffield, England, during the Second World War. It took place over the nights of 12 December and 15 December 1940.

In 1940, Sheffield was a city of about 560,000 people and contained many heavy industries, primarily centred on steel and armaments. Hadfields steelworks was also the only place in the UK at that time where 18-inch armour-piercing shells were made. Most of the factories were located in the East End of the city beside the River Don. Documents captured at the end of the war showed that the targets for the raids included the Atlas Steelworks, Brown Bayley Steelworks, Meadowhall Iron Works, River Don Works, Darnall Wagon Works, Tinsley Park Collieries, East Hecla Works and Orgreave Coke Ovens.

The full moon was on 14 December 1940 and both blitz nights were cold and clear.

The German code name for the operation was Schmelztiegel ("Crucible").

12 December raid

On the afternoon of Thursday 12 December, British monitoring stations detected X Verfahren (sometimes called X-Gerät) radio beams being laid across northern England and calculated that the likely target of the coming raid would be Sheffield.

The yellow alert was received at 6:15pm followed by the purple alert at 6:45pm. The red alert was sounded at 7pm. The attack was made by three main groups of aircraft flying from airfields in northern France, including Cambrai. 13 Heinkel 111s from Kampfgruppe 100, the German Pathfinder unit arrived over the city at 7:41pm and dropped 16 SC50 high-explosive bombs, 1,009 B1 E1 ZA incendiaries and 10,080 B1 E1 incendiaries. The first incendiaries were dropped over the suburbs of Norton Lees and Gleadless.

The first main group was made up of three waves of 36 Junkers 88s and 29 Heinkel 111s. The second group was made up of 23 Junkers 88s, 74 Heinkel 111s and 7 Dornier 17s. The last group was made up of 63 Junkers 88s and 35 Heinkel 111s, a total of 280 aircraft.
At about 9:30pm a line of bombs fell on Campo Lane and Vicar Lane, demolishing the West end of the Cathedral. At about 10:50pm a 500 kg bomb fell on and destroyed the C&A and Burtons buildings opposite the Marples Hotel in Fitzalan Square.
At 11:44pm, The Marples Hotel itself received a direct hit. The death toll there was 78 this was the single biggest loss of life in the attacks. Full details of the identities of the victims and the extensive police efforts made to ensure everyone was identified can be found in the Sheffield City Archives. The myth that some bodies were left in situ is just that – the deceased were found in the cellar which was effectively a huge concrete box with deep encasing floors and walls. The location is beneath the carriageway outside the Marples building. 
The majority of the bombs on this night fell on the City Centre or on residential districts with the last bombs falling at 4am.

15 December raid

Sunday, the second night of the Blitz saw the first use of a new German policy for their pathfinders. High-explosive bombs were no longer carried and were replaced by incendiaries. On this night the pathfinder force was made up of 16 Heinkel 111s that dropped 11,520 B1 E1 incendiaries between 7pm and 7:50pm. The 15 large fires and the numerous small fires started were visible from 150 km away.

The main raid was carried out by 50 Heinkel 111s and 11 Dornier 17s. The raid finished at 10:15pm. Many steelworks received hits, including Hadfields, Brown Bayleys and Steel, Peech and Tozer Ltd, although the damage was not serious enough to affect production.

Aftermath

In total over 660 people were killed, 1,500 injured and 40,000 made homeless. 3,000 homes were demolished with a further 3,000 badly damaged. A total of 78,000 homes received damage. Six George Medals were awarded to citizens of Sheffield for their bravery during the raids. 134 victims of the raids were buried in a communal grave in City Road Cemetery.

King George VI and Queen Elizabeth toured the city soon after the raids to inspect the damage and boost morale amongst survivors. Prime Minister Winston Churchill also toured the blitzed city, speaking through loudspeakers to a 20,000-strong crowd in Town Hall Square and giving his signature 'V' for 'Victory' V sign.

Stage play

Operation Crucible a play about the Sheffield Blitz by Kieran Knowles, has been performed in London, Sheffield and New York.

References

Further reading
Anderson, Neil (2010) Sheffield's Date With Hitler ACM Retro 
Anderson, Neil (2012) Forgotten Memories From A Forgotten Blitz ACM Retro 
Knowles, Kieran (2013) Operation Crucible Oberon Books 
Lofthouse, Alistair (2001) Then & Now: The Sheffield Blitz – Operation Crucible Ald Design & Print

External links
Sources for the Study of the Sheffield Blitz Produced by Sheffield City Council's Libraries and Archives.
Website for the Finborough Theatre's Production of Operation Crucible by Kieran Knowles

Blitz
The Blitz
1940s in Yorkshire
Military history of Yorkshire
1940s in Sheffield